The Feathered Serpent (also titled Charlie Chan in the Feathered Serpent) is a 1948 mystery film, the fifth of six in which Roland Winters portrayed Charlie Chan.  It is the only Chan film which featured both Keye Luke and Victor Sen Yung together. Luke had been cast in the later Warner Oland Chan films while Yung appeared primarily in the Sidney Toler Chan movies. This was Yung's last Chan movie.  Luke appeared in one more with Roland Winters, the last of the Chan films, Sky Dragon (1949).

Cast
Roland Winters as Charlie Chan
Mantan Moreland as Birmingham Brown
Keye Luke as Lee Chan
Victor Sen Yung as Tommy Chan
Carol Forman as Sonia Cabot
Robert Livingston as John Stanley
Nils Asther as Professor Paul Evans
Beverly Jons as Joan Farnsworth
Martin Garralaga as Pedro Lopez
George J. Lewis as Captain Juan Gonzalez
Leslie Denison as Professor Henry Farnsworth

External links

1948 films
American black-and-white films
Charlie Chan films
Films directed by William Beaudine
Monogram Pictures films
1948 mystery films
American mystery films
1940s American films